Joel Morgan is a Seychellois politician and the Minister of Foreign Affairs and Transport since 2015. He served as Minister of Home Affairs since 2010.

References 

Living people
Seychellois politicians
Foreign Ministers of Seychelles
Interior ministers of Seychelles
Transport ministers of Seychelles
Year of birth missing (living people)